Kaakha Kaakha, titled The Police in the UK, is a 2003 Indian Tamil-language action thriller film written and directed by Gautham Vasudev Menon. It stars Suriya and Jyothika, with Jeevan playing the antagonist. The film featured music composed by Harris Jayaraj and cinematography by R. D. Rajasekhar. The film released on 1 August 2003 to highly positive reviews and was considered a comeback film for producer Kalaipuli S. Thanu. It became Suriya's first biggest blockbuster. Owing to its commercial success, the film has been remade in several languages.

Plot 
Anbuselvan is an honest, daring IPS officer with the Chennai City Police as the ACP in the Crime Branch. As he has no family or relatives, he lives with no fear. Anbuselvan and his IPS friends Srikanth, Arul, and Ilamaran are recruited for part of a special unit of police officers who are battling organised crime in Chennai. Violent and laconic, Anbuselvan finds little patience for his personal life. The unit is ruthless in its confrontation with criminals, going as far as assassinating gang members. The unit is finally disbanded after 5 encounters in 3 months, by Human rights authorities, where Anbuselvan is posted to Control Room Duties. One day, a school teacher named Maya rebuffs Anbuselvan's routine questions regarding safety, not knowing that he is a police officer. 

Anbuselvan meets Maya again when she and her friend are questioned for driving without a license. However, Anbuselvan lets them off with a warning. When one of Maya's students has a problem with local kids, she asks Anbuselvan for help. Anbuselvan resolves this problem, a mutual respect grows between them, and they begin seeing one another. When Maya gets into a road accident, Anbuselvan helps her recover, and they fall in love. Srikanth and his wife Swathi become good friends with Maya. Sethu is a gangster, who escaped the encounter operations, meets his estranged brother Pandiya, who returns to Chennai after 14 years of crime life in Maharashtra. Pandiya has a peculiar tactic: he kills a family member of his opponent, but leaves the opponent alive to rot in failure and depression on the loss of his family member. 

Sethu's gang, aided by Pandiya's planning, commit major kidnappings in the city and become very powerful in 6 months. The 10-year-old son of an influential movie producer is kidnapped and killed, and later his daughter is also kidnapped for ransom. The special unit is reassembled by the commissioner with all four back in the crime branch. The unit tracks down and kills Sethu in a railyard, as others escape.  Pandiya takes over the gang, promising grave revenge over his brother's death. Pandiya and his gang members target the families of the men in the special unit, but the police close in, and a badly injured Pandiya barely escapes Anbuselvan. Pandiya and his men brutally kill Ilamaran the same night, and escape. The entire department is mobilised, and all family members of the remaining three are sent into hiding. Maya and Anbuselvan get married in a hurry and leave for Pondicherry. 

However, Pandiya and his thugs enter the cottage the next day where the couple are honeymooning and attack Anbuselvan, leaving him for dead, and kidnapping Maya. Anbuselvan is battling for life but thinking only about rescuing Maya. Srikanth and Arul arrive at the cottage, discover Anbuselvan, and take him to the Pondicherry Government Hospital. Srikanth reveals that Swathi was kidnapped earlier at the airport and confesses that it was he who gave away Anbuselvan's location to Pandiya, for Swathi's safe return. Srikanth feels extreme remorse over what has happened. Whilst in the hospital, they receive a message from Pandiya to meet him at a particular location in Andhra Pradesh. When they go there, they find two packages, one containing Swathi's severed head and the other one containing Maya's arm flesh. 

Srikanth and Anbuselvan are distraught, with the former being hysterical upon seeing his wife's head, and in an agony of grief and guilt at being responsible, he shoots himself dead. Anbuselvan and Arul track down Pandiya before he can escape from Tamil Nadu and fight with the gang. Anbuselvan aims to shoot Pandiya, but Pandiya shoots Maya while using her as a shield, and she dies in Anbuselvan's arms. An enraged Anbuselvan tracks down Pandiya and brutally finishes him off, avenging Maya and his friends' deaths. An epilogue shows that Anbuselvan, after the death of Maya, continues his job as an IPS officer some months later, while still reminiscing his moments with Maya.

Cast

Production 
The film was initially titled as Paathi (Half) and then as Kalam, before the team opted to change the title to Kaakha Kaakha. Gautham Vasudev Menon revealed that he was inspired to make the film after reading of articles on how encounter specialists shoot gangsters and how their families get threatening calls in return, and initially approached Madhavan, Ajith Kumar and Vikram for the role without success. The lead actress Jyothika asked Menon to consider Suriya for the role, and he was subsequently selected after Menon saw his portrayal in Nandha. Many producers refuse to do this film as they could not make a film on the budget fixed by Menon that too with Suriya, it was Thanu who finally agreed to produce the film.

Menon did a rehearsal of the script with the actors, a costume trial with Jyothika and then enrolled Suriya in a commando training school before beginning production, which he described as a "very planned shoot". In order to prepare for the role, Suriya met real-life police officers Vijayakumar and Shailendra Babu and discussed about their encounter experiences. The film had an alternate ending which showed Jyothika's character surviving; it was released only on DVD. An outhouse set was built at Nuwera Eliya at Sri Lanka which costed . The scene where Suriya falls from the outhouse, he performed it without dupe.

Release
Guru Subramaniam of Rediff.com labelled Kaakha Kaakha a "career high film". Malathi Rangarajan of The Hindu described it as for "action lovers who believe in logical storylines and deft treatment" and praised Menon for his linear narrative screenplay. The film was a major breakthrough for both Menon and Suriya.

Remakes 
Menon remade the film in Telugu as Gharshana (2004) for producer Venkata Raj and it went on to be highly successful as well as being a hit in Telugu theatres. In July 2004, he agreed terms to direct and produce another version of Kaakha Kaakha in Hindi with Sunny Deol in the lead role and revealed that the script was written five years ago with Deol in mind, but the film eventually failed to take off. Producer Vipul Amrutlal Shah approached him to direct the Hindi version of the film in 2010 as Force, and Menon initially agreed before pulling out again. The film was also made in Kannada in 2011 as Dandam Dashagunam. Menon and the original producer, Dhanu, also floated an idea of an English version with a Chechnyan backdrop, though talks with a potential collaboration with Ashok Amritraj collapsed.

Accolades 
In addition to the following list of awards and nominations, prominent Indian film websites named Kaakha Kaakha one of the 10 best Tamil films of 2003, with Rediff, Sify and Behindwoods all doing so. The film was, before release, in "most awaited" lists from film websites.

Soundtrack 
The film's music was composed by Harris Jayaraj marking his second collaboration with Menon after Minnale. The song "Ondra Renda" is based on "Dil Ko Tumse Pyar Hua" from the 2001 Hindi film Rehnaa Hai Terre Dil Mein in which Harris himself was the music director.

References

External links 
 

2000s police procedural films
2000s romantic action films
2000s Tamil-language films
2003 action thriller films
2003 films
Fictional portrayals of the Tamil Nadu Police
Films about organised crime in India
Films directed by Gautham Vasudev Menon
Films scored by Harris Jayaraj
Films set in Chennai
Indian action thriller films
Indian nonlinear narrative films
Indian romantic action films
Tamil films remade in other languages